"Somebody's Been Beating My Time" is a country music song written by Zeke Clements, sung by Eddy Arnold, and released on the RCA Victor label. In October 1951, it reached No. 2 on the country juke box chart. It spent 16 weeks on the charts and was the No. 23 best selling country record of 1951.

See also
 Billboard Top Country & Western Records of 1951

References

Eddy Arnold songs
1951 songs
Songs written by Zeke Clements